"Little Good-Byes" is a song written by Kristyn Osborn, Jason Deere and Kenny Greenberg, and recorded by American country music group SHeDAISY. It was released in February 1999 as the lead single from their debut album The Whole SHeBANG.

The song's B-side, "Still Holding Out for You", was the fifth and final single from the album.

Chart performance

Year-end charts

References

1999 songs
1999 debut singles
SHeDAISY songs
Song recordings produced by Dann Huff
Songs written by Jason Deere
Songs written by Kristyn Osborn
Lyric Street Records singles